José Luis Russo (born July 14, 1958, in Montevideo, Uruguay) is a former Uruguayan footballer who played for clubs of Uruguay, Chile and Colombia.

Teams
  Huracán Buceo 1976-1979
  Defensor Sporting 1980-1982
  Deportes Tolima 1983-1984
  Atlético Bucaramanga 1985
  Peñarol 1986
  Independiente Medellín 1987
  Deportes Iquique 1988-1991
  Huracán Buceo 1992-1993

References

External links
 

1958 births
Living people
Uruguayan footballers
Uruguayan expatriate footballers
Peñarol players
Huracán Buceo players
Defensor Sporting players
Atlético Bucaramanga footballers
Independiente Medellín footballers
Deportes Tolima footballers
Deportes Iquique footballers
Uruguayan Primera División players
Categoría Primera A players
Primera B de Chile players
Chilean Primera División players
Expatriate footballers in Chile
Expatriate footballers in Colombia
Association football defenders